Kalbe may refer to:

Kalbe, Saxony-Anhalt, town in Altmarkkreis Salzwedel, Saxony-Anhalt, Germany
Kalbe, Lower Saxony, municipality in Rotenburg, Lower Saxony, Germany
Kalbe (Meißner), mountain in Hesse, Germany

See also
Calbe, town in Salzlandkreis, Saxony-Anhalt, Germany
Kalbe Farma, pharmaceutical company in North Jakarta